Pakho Kalan is a village of Punjab, India  which is located in Barnala district and situated on the Barnala–Mansa road. It is 22 km from Barnala and 28 km from Mansa.
Khurd and Kalan Persian language word which means small and Big respectively when two villages have same name then it is distinguished as Kalan means Big and Khurd means Small with Village Name.World Famous person Jathedar Ajit singh pakho was resident of this village

References

Villages in Barnala district